The year 2022 is the 5th year in the history of the Bare Knuckle Fighting Championship, a bare-knuckle fighting promotion based in Philadelphia.

Background 
2022 season is expected to start with Bare Knuckle Fighting Championship Fight Night: Jackson. BKFC is available on PPV all over the world and on FITE TV.

List of events

Bare Knuckle Fighting Championship Fight Night: Jackson

Bare Knuckle Fighting Championship Fight Night: Jackson was a bare-knuckle fighting event held by Bare Knuckle Fighting Championship on January 29, 2022, at the Jackson Convention Complex in Jackson, Mississippi, USA.

Background
The event featured a rematch between Elvin Brito and Kaleb Harris for the inaugural BKFC Welterweight Championship.

Results

Bare Knuckle Fighting Championship: KnuckleMania 2

Bare Knuckle Fighting Championship: KnuckleMania 2 was a bare-knuckle fighting event held by Bare Knuckle Fighting Championship on February 19, 2022, at the Jackson Convention Complex in Hollywood, Florida, USA.

Background
The main event featured a world title fight for the BKFC Lightweight Championship between the champion Luis Palomino and the challenger Martin Brown.

The event featured the BKFC debut of former UFC fighters Chad Mendes and Mike Perry.

The event also featured a fight for the vacant BKFC Women's Flyweight Championship Christine Ferea and Britain Hart.

Fight Card

Bare Knuckle Fighting Championship Fight Night: New York 2

Bare Knuckle Fighting Championship Fight Night: New York 2 was a bare-knuckle fighting event held by Bare Knuckle Fighting Championship on March 12, 2022 at the Seneca Allegany Resort & Casino Event Center in Miami, USA.

Background
The event featured the promotion's return to New York. 

A BKFC Bantamweight Championship fight between the defending champion Johnny Bedford and Jarod Grant was Originally scheduled to headline the card. However, Bedford had to pull out from the bout due to injury. Anthony Retic steep in on late notice to face Grant for the interim BKFC Bantamweight Championship.

Results

Bare Knuckle Fighting Championship 23

Bare Knuckle Fighting Championship 23 was a bare-knuckle fighting event to be held by Bare Knuckle Fighting Championship on April 8, 2022, at the  Intrust Bank Arenain Wichita, Kansas, USA.

Background
The event featured the promotion's return to Kansas.

A middleweight bout between two Bellator veterant Mike Richman and David Rickels served as the event headliner.

Results

Bare Knuckle Fighting Championship Fight Night: Ft. Lauderdale

Bare Knuckle Fighting Championship Fight Night: Ft. Lauderdale was a bare-knuckle fighting event held by Bare Knuckle Fighting Championship on April 21, 2022 in Fort Lauderdale, Florida, USA.

Background
The event featured the return of former UFC fighter Joey Beltran in his first fight since losing the BKFC Heavyweight Championship.

Results

Bare Knuckle Fighting Championship 24

Bare Knuckle Fighting Championship 24 was a bare-knuckle fighting event held by Bare Knuckle Fighting Championship on April 30, 2022, at the Montana Expo Park in Great Falls, Montana, USA.

Background
The event featured the promotion's return to Montana.

A BKFC Light Heavyweight Championship bout between current champion Lorenzo Hunt and the challenger Joe Riggs headlined the event.

Results

Bare Knuckle Fighting Championship 25

Bare Knuckle Fighting Championship 25 was a bare-knuckle fighting event held by Bare Knuckle Fighting Championship on May 6, 2022, at the Caribe Royale Orlando in Orlando, Florida, USA .

Background
The event featured the promotion's return to Florida.

A BKFC Heavyweight Championship bout between current champion Arnold Adams and the challenger Dillon Cleckler served as the event headliner.

Results

BKFC Thailand 2: Iconic Impact 

BKFC Thailand 2: Iconic Impact was a bare-knuckle fighting event held by Bare Knuckle Fighting Championship on May 7, 2022, in Pattaya, Thailand.

Background 
In the main event, Sirimongkol Singmanasak and Mike Vetrila competed for the inaugural BKFC Thailand Light Heavyweight Championship. 

The co-main event saw Souris Manfredi facing Fani Peloumpi for the inaugural BKFC Thailand Women's Strawweight Championship.

Results

Bare Knuckle Fighting Championship Fight Night: Omaha

Bare Knuckle Fighting Championship Fight Night: Omaha was a bare-knuckle fighting event held by Bare Knuckle Fighting Championship on May 13, 2022, at the Liberty First Credit Union Arena in Omaha, Nebraska, USA.

Background
The event featured the promotion's return to Omaha. 

The originally planned main event of a rematch between Bec Rawlings and Britain Hart was cancelled due to Hart having a medical emergency. The light heavyweight bout between Dakota Cochrane and Josh Dyer served as the new main event.

Results

Bare Knuckle Fighting Championship Fight Night: Jackson 2

Bare Knuckle Fighting Championship Fight Night: Jackson 2 was a bare-knuckle fighting event held by Bare Knuckle Fighting Championship on June 11, 2022, at the Jackson Convention Complex in Jackson, Mississippi, USA.

Background
The event marked the promotion's return to Jackson, Mississippi.

The main event featured a heavyweight bout between the former UFC fighter Alan Belcher and Frank Tate.

Results

Bare Knuckle Fighting Championship 26: Hollywood

Bare Knuckle Fighting Championship 26: Hollywood was a bare-knuckle fighting event held by Bare Knuckle Fighting Championship on June 24, 2022, at the Seminole Hard Rock Hotel & Casino in Hollywood, Florida, USA.

Background
A BKFC Welterweight Championship bout between the current BKFC welterweight champion Elvin Brito and the current BKFC lightweight champion Luis Palomino served as the event headliner.

The event featured a rematch in the women's Flyweight division between Bec Rawlings and Britain Hart. The pairing previously met in 2018 prior at BKFC 2, which Rawlings won via split decision. They were previously scheduled to fight May 13 at BKFC Fight Night: Omaha, but the bout was canceled due to Hart having a medical emergency.

Former UFC contender Jimmie Rivera made his BKFC debut against Howard Davis on this card.

Results

Bare Knuckle Fighting Championship Fight Night: Tampa 2

Bare Knuckle Fighting Championship Fight Night: Tampa 2 will be a bare-knuckle fighting event to be held by Bare Knuckle Fighting Championship on July 23, 2022, at the Florida State Fairgrounds in Tampa, Florida, USA.

Background

Fight Card

Bare Knuckle Fighting Championship 27: London

Bare Knuckle Fighting Championship 27: London will be a bare-knuckle fighting event to be held by Bare Knuckle Fighting Championship on August 20, 2022, at the OVO Arena in London, England.

Background
A middleweight bout between Bellator MMA fighter Michael Page and former UFC fighter Mike Perry served as the event headliner. This is the second time in BKFC history that a bout went to a sixth overtime round.

The fight between Paige VanZant and Charisa Sigala was expected to serve as the co-main event. The fight was canceled few days ahead of the event and was subsequently rescheduled to take place at BKFC 31 on October 15.

Fight Card

Bare Knuckle Fighting Championship 28: Albuquerque

Bare Knuckle Fighting Championship 28: Albuquerque will be a bare-knuckle fighting event to be held by Bare Knuckle Fighting Championship on August 27, 2022, at the Rio Rancho Events Center in Rio Rancho, New Mexico, USA.

Background

Fight Card

BKFC Thailand 3: Moment of Truth 

BKFC Thailand 3: Moment of Truth was a bare-knuckle fighting event held by Bare Knuckle Fighting Championship on September 3, 2022, in Bangkok, Thailand.

Background
The main event will feature Muay Thai legend and two-time K-1 World MAX Champion Buakaw Banchamek making his bare-knuckle debut against Turkish kickboxing champion Erkan Varol. Pongpisan Chunyong will face Surasak Sukkhamcha for the inaugural BKFC Thailand Featherweight Championship in the co-main event.

Fight card

Bare Knuckle Fighting Championship 29: Montana

Bare Knuckle Fighting Championship 29: Montana was a bare-knuckle fighting event held by Bare Knuckle Fighting Championship on September 10, 2022, at the Pacific Steel & Recycling Arena in Great Falls, Montana, USA.

Background
The event featured the promotion's return to Montana.

A BKFC Strawweight Championship bout between Britain Hart and BKFC Thailand Strawweight Champion Fani Peloumpi was due to headline the event however Peloumpi fell out due to visa issues.

Results

Bare Knuckle Fighting Championship 30: Monroe

Bare Knuckle Fighting Championship 30: Monroe was a bare-knuckle fighting event held by Bare Knuckle Fighting Championship on October 1, 2022, at the Fant Ewing Coliseum in Monroe, Louisiana, USA.

Background
A BKFC Cruiserweight Championship bout between the BKFC Light Heavyweight Champion Lorenzo Hunt and Quentin Henry served as the event headliner.

Results

Bare Knuckle Fighting Championship 31: Denver

Bare Knuckle Fighting Championship 31 was a bare-knuckle fighting event held by Bare Knuckle Fighting Championship on October 15, 2022, at the 1st Bank Center in Broomfield, Colorado, USA.

Background
Having been moved from BKFC 27, the bout between Paige VanZant and Charisa Sigala was supposed to be the headliner of this event. However, Sigala stepped up on short notice to replace Fani Peloumpi at BKFC 29, leaving VanZant without an opponent.

The event was then ultimately headlined by Mike Richman vs. Isaac Doolittle for the interim BKFC Light Heavyweight Championship.

Melvin Guillard was initially scheduled to face Evgeny Kurdanov, but he was ultimately not allowed to compete after Colorado Combative Sports Commission denied his license on the grounds of health concerns.

Results

Bare Knuckle Fighting Championship 32: Orlando

Bare Knuckle Fighting Championship 32 was a bare-knuckle fighting event held by Bare Knuckle Fighting Championship on November 5, 2022, at the Caribe Royale in Orlando, Florida, USA.

Results

Bare Knuckle Fighting Championship 33: Omaha

Bare Knuckle Fighting Championship 33 was a bare-knuckle fighting event held by Bare Knuckle Fighting Championship on November 18, 2022, at the Liberty First Arena in Omaha, Nebraska, USA.

Results

BKFC Fight Night: Newcastle

BKFC Fight Night: Newcastle was a bare-knuckle fighting event held by Bare Knuckle Fighting Championship on November 26, 2022 in Newcastle upon Tyne, England.

Results

Bare Knuckle Fighting Championship 34: Hollywood

Bare Knuckle Fighting Championship 34 was a bare-knuckle fighting event held by Bare Knuckle Fighting Championship at the Seminole Hard Rock Hotel & Casino on December 3, 2022 in Hollywood, Florida, USA. 

Background

The main event saw current BKFC middleweight champion Luis Palomino defending his belt against Tom Shoaff. The co-main event featured Francesco Ricchi up against David Mundell for the vacant BKFC middleweight title.

Fight Card

BKFC Asia 4: The Big Bash

BKFC Asia 4: The Big Bash was a bare-knuckle fighting event held by Bare Knuckle Fighting Championship at SpacePlus Bangkok RCA on December 10, 2022 in Bangkok, Thailand.

Fight card

See also 
Bare Knuckle Fighting Championship

References

External links
   Bare Knuckle Official Website

Bare Knuckle Fighting Championship
2022 in boxing
2022 sport-related lists